Hamilton Lane Morrow (June 17, 1846 – August 6, 1922) was a farmer and political figure in Nova Scotia, Canada. He represented Guysborough County in the Nova Scotia House of Assembly from 1890 to 1894 as a Liberal-Conservative member.

He was born in St. Peter's Bay, Prince Edward Island and educated there and at the normal school in Charlottetown. In 1873, he married Mary A. Harty. Morrow taught school in Prince Edward Island for several years. He served as secretary for the Milford Haven Agricultural Society. He died in 1922 of cancer.

References 

The Canadian parliamentary companion, 1891 JA Gemmill

1846 births
1922 deaths
Progressive Conservative Association of Nova Scotia MLAs